Individual Sky Cruiser Theory is an EP by Earthlings? released in 2006 through Empirical Recordings. It was released as a 7" Vinyl EP, Limited to 500 Copies in Black and 500 Copies in Purple Swirl.

Track listing
"Individual Sky Cruiser Theory" – 6:44
"Stoner Rock Rules (Who Wrote?)" – 2:53
"Sick Ass Pretty" – 3:40

Credits
earthlings?
Dave Catching - Guitars
Pete Stahl - Vocals
Adam Maples - drums, vocals
Brant Bjork - drums
Molly McGuire - Bass
Mathias Schneeberger - Keyboards, Guitars

References

Earthlings? albums
2006 EPs